Flora Martinez (born 1 November 1977) is a Colombian film and television actress and singer, best known for her title role in the film Rosario Tijeras. Martinez was nominated for Goya Award for Best Spanish Language Foreign Film in 2005.

Biography 

Martinez was born in Montreal to a Canadian mother and a Colombian father, and raised in Bogotá and North Vancouver.  She began her career in television in Colombia appearing in telenovelas such as Mambo (1994), María Bonita (1995), and La Otra Mitad del Sol (1995). She is a Canadian citizen and speaks fluent French, Spanish and English.

She studied at the Actors Conservatory in New York City from 1997 through 1999. In 1999, she appeared in her first feature film, Soplo de Vida, for which she won the Best Actress Award at the Biarritz Film Festival in France.  She has worked in the theater in the staging of Herat by Daniel Berardi.

Martinez starred in Lolita's Club (2007), I'm With Lucy (2002) and Violet of a Thousand Colors (2005). In 2011, she starred as the lead of the television series La Bruja (The Witch).

Filmography

References

External links
 Flora Martinez Website
 
 

1977 births
Colombian film actresses
Colombian television actresses
Canadian film actresses
Canadian television actresses
Canadian people of Colombian descent
Actresses from Montreal
Living people
20th-century Colombian actresses
21st-century Colombian actresses